Kiaran MacDonald is an English amateur boxer. He won a silver medal at the 2022 European Championships and competed at the 2021 World Championships.

He won sliver medal in Commonwealth Games 2022 at Birmingham in 51 kg flyweight category. He lost to Amit Panghal from India.

References

Living people
English male boxers
Southpaw boxers
Flyweight boxers
Boxers at the 2022 Commonwealth Games
Commonwealth Games silver medallists for England
Commonwealth Games medallists in boxing
21st-century English people
1997 births
Medallists at the 2022 Commonwealth Games